Fatin Rüştü Zorlu (20 April 1910 – 16 September 1961) was a Turkish diplomat and politician. He was executed by hanging after the coup d'état in 1960 along with two other politicians.

Early life and education
He was born on 20 April 1910 in Istanbul to a family originating from the village of Zor, Artvin in northeastern Turkey. After finishing high school at Galatasaray High School, Zorlu was educated in political science at the Institut d'études politiques de Paris, France and in law at the University of Geneva, Switzerland.

Political career
Returning to Turkey, Zorlu began his career as a diplomat in 1932 in the Ministry of Foreign Affairs. From 1938 on, he served at various posts in embassies and consulates in Bern (Switzerland), Paris (France), Moscow (USSR), Beirut (Lebanon) and at the ministry in Ankara as well. Following Turkey’s joining of NATO on 18 February 1952 he was appointed ambassador to NATO at the Supreme Headquarters Allied Powers Europe in Paris.

In 1954, Zorlu entered politics and was elected into the Turkish Grand National Assembly as the deputy of Çanakkale for the Democratic Party. He served as deputy prime minister between 1954 and 1955 and as minister of state in 1955. In 1955 he was also acting minister of foreign affairs and participated in the Tripartite Conference on Cyprus problem in London in June that year. He was appointed minister for foreign affairs in 1957 and held the post until 27 May 1960  when the Turkish Armed Forces staged a coup and ousted the government of Prime Minister Adnan Menderes. In 1959 he participated along with Adnan Menderes in the Bilderberg meeting in Yesilkoy, Turkey. It is rumoured that the coup might have something to do with that meeting.

During his tenure as minister of foreign affairs Turkey applied for the membership of the European Economic Community in 1959.

Arrest and execution
He was arrested along with other party members, charged with violating the constitution, and put on trial on the island of Yassıada. His roommate in the Yassıada prison was Celal Yardımcı, a fellow party member and minister of justice. He and Menderes were accused by the court of planning the Istanbul Pogrom. Though both of them rejected the claims, it is believed by scholars that Menderes assented to the organization of protests in İstanbul against the Greeks, but the extent of knowledge of Zorlu, who had been in London for the conference, is unclear. According to Zorlu's lawyer at the Yassiada trial, a mob of 300,000 was marshaled in a radius of  around the city for the attacks.

Zorlu was sentenced to death and executed by hanging on the island of İmralı on 16 September 1961 along with Adnan Menderes and Hasan Polatkan. He approached the gallows calmly, helped the hangman to lay the noose around his neck.

Personal life
Zorlu married Emel Aras on 29 October 1933. She was the daughter of Tevfik Rüştü Aras who was serving as the minister of foreign affairs at that time. Fatin Rüştü Zorlu and Emel Aras had a daughter, Sevin Zorlu (1936–2006), who was a journalist.

Legacy
Many years after his death his grave was moved to a mausoleum in İstanbul on 17 September 1990 along with the graves of the two other cabinet members hanged.

See also
 List of Turkish diplomats

References

External links

 Biyografi.info - Biography of Fatin Rüştü Zorlu 

1910 births
1961 deaths
Politicians from Istanbul
People from Constantinople vilayet
Democrat Party (Turkey, 1946–1961) politicians
20th-century Turkish diplomats
Ministers of Foreign Affairs of Turkey
Deputy Prime Ministers of Turkey
Deputies of Çanakkale
Permanent Representatives of Turkey to NATO
Galatasaray High School alumni
Executed politicians
Executed Turkish people
People executed by Turkey by hanging
20th-century executions by Turkey
People who have received posthumous pardons
Members of the 21st government of Turkey
Members of the 23rd government of Turkey
Members of the 22nd government of Turkey
Grand Crosses 1st class of the Order of Merit of the Federal Republic of Germany
Politicians arrested in Turkey
People expelled from public office
Burials at Topkapı Cemetery
Istanbul pogrom